The 1942 Major League Baseball season was contested from April 14 to October 5, 1942. The St. Louis Cardinals and New York Yankees were the regular season champions of the National League and American League, respectively. The Cardinals then defeated the Yankees in the World Series, four games to one.

In the National League, the Brooklyn Dodgers had a record of 104–50, but finished two games behind the Cardinals; the Dodgers tied the 1909 Chicago Cubs, who had a record of 104–49, for the most wins in an MLB regular season without reaching the postseason.

Awards and honors
Baseball Hall of Fame
Rogers Hornsby
Most Valuable Player
Joe Gordon (AL) – New York Yankees (2B)
Mort Cooper (NL) – St. Louis Cardinals (P)
The Sporting News Player of the Year Award
Ted Williams – Boston Red Sox (LF)
The Sporting News Most Valuable Player Award
Joe Gordon (AL) – New York Yankees (2B)
Mort Cooper (NL) – St. Louis Cardinals (P)
The Sporting News Manager of the Year Award
Billy Southworth – St. Louis Cardinals

Standings

American League

National League

Postseason

Bracket

Managers

American League

National League

Home Field Attendance

Feats
The Philadelphia Athletics set a record for the fewest runs batted in during a season, with only 354.

References

External links
1942 Major League Baseball season schedule at Baseball Reference

 
Major League Baseball seasons